Eduardo Noriega (September 25, 1916 – August 14, 2007) was a Mexican film actor who appeared in over 100 films, mainly Mexican.

His best-known English-language role was as Don Francisco from San Jose in Zorro, The Gay Blade (1981). Other film roles included Cameahwait in The Far Horizons (1955), Señor Dominguez in Of Love and Desire (1963), and Inspector Talmadge in Tarzan and the Valley of Gold (1966).

Noriega also appeared in several television productions, such as La esposa virgen and Entre el amor y el odio.

Family
He was married twice. He had four children with his first wife: Eduardo, Ricardo, Esteban and Laura.  Ricardo followed in his father's footsteps and went into acting.  His son, Esteban, preceded him in death.

Selected filmography
 The Associate (1946) - Corredor de bolsa
 The Woman of the Port (1949)
 The Eagle and the Hawk (1950) - Roberto the Cobbler
 Immaculate (1950)
 The Magnificent Matador (1955)
 The Far Horizons (1955) - Cameahwait
 The Beast of Hollow Mountain (1956) - Enrique Rios
 Of Love and Desire (1963) - Señor Dominguez
 Tarzan and the Valley of Gold (1966) - Insp. Talmadge
 Guyana: Crime of the Century (1979)
 Zorro, the Gay Blade (1981) - Don Francisco
 Pier 5, Havana (1959) -Fernando Ricardo

Television
 Prisionera de amor (Prisoner of Love) (1994), telenovela
 La esposa virgen
 Entre el amor y el odio

References

External links

 
 

Male actors from Mexico City
1916 births
2007 deaths
Mexican male film actors
Expatriate male actors in the United States
Mexican expatriates in the United States